John Joseph Powell (September 22, 1925September 24, 2009) was a Jesuit priest and author, and brother of Rita Donlan and William Powell.

He received elementary-school education at the John B. Murphy public school in Chicago.  In  June 1943, Powell graduated from the Loyola Academy in Chicago. In  August 1943,  he entered the Society of Jesus at Milford, Ohio.  In the fall of 1947, he began a three-year  course in philosophy at West Baden College, and enrolled in Loyola University, where he took a Bachelor of Arts degree the following June.  He began graduate work at Loyola in 1948 and was ordained to the priesthood in 1956.

Powell worked at West Baden University (1961-1965), the Bellarmine School of Theology of Loyola University (1965-1968) and Loyola University (1968-2001), where he became an associate professor of theology and psychology.  Powell was a proponent of humanistic Catholicism and wrote many books mostly dealing with psychology and Catholic theology, and conducted spiritual retreats along with his counseling work. He later retired in Michigan and allegedly died with Alzheimer's disease.

Powell was accused of abusing of at least seven female students in the 1960s and 1970s.  He was first sued in 2003 and again in 2006. Six of his alleged victims settled their litigation with the Jesuits in 2005. .

Publications

Why Am I Afraid to Tell You Who I Am?  
Why Am I Afraid to Love?  
The Secret of Staying in Love  
Unconditional love
Fully human, fully alive: A new life through a new vision   
He Touched Me - My Pilgrimage of Prayer   
Will the Real Me Please Stand Up?: 25 Guidelines for Good Communication  
A Reason to Live! A Reason to Die!     
Abortion the Silent Holocaust (1981)   
Happiness Is an Inside Job (1989)

References

1925 births
2009 deaths
20th-century American Jesuits
21st-century American Jesuits
American theologians
20th-century American psychologists
Loyola University Chicago alumni